Simha Flapan (1911–1987) was an Israeli historian and politician. He is known for his book The Birth of Israel: Myths And Realities, published in the year of his death.

Biography
Simha Flapan was born on 27 January 1911 in Tomaszów Mazowiecki, Congress Poland. In Israel,
Flapan was National Secretary of the left Zionist Mapam party, and the director of its Arab Affairs department from 1959 to the mid-1970s; he also edited New Outlook magazine—a non-party monthly that promoted Arab-Jewish rapprochement.

He died on 13 April 1987 in Israel.

View on Zionism 
In the preface of 'Zionism and the Palestinians' (1979) Flapan writes: 
To dispel misunderstanding, I want to make it clear that my belief in the moral justification and historical necessity of Zionism remains unaffected by my critical reappraisal of the Zionist leadership. The history of Zionism demonstrates the extent to which the urge to create a new society, embodying the universal values of democracy and social justice, was inherent in the Zionist movement and responsible for its progress in adverse conditions. Israel's problem today lies in the disintegration of these values, due largely to the intoxication with military success and the belief that military superiority is a substitute for peace. Unless the liberal and progressive values of Zionism are restored and Palestinian rights to self-determination within a framework of peaceful coexistence are recognised, Israel's search for peace is doomed to failure. I firmly believe that these trends will ultimately become the deciding force in Israel.

Published works 
 Zionism and the Palestinians, Croom and Helm, London, 1979.
 The Birth of Israel: Myths And Realities, Pantheon Books, New York;  (August 1987).

Archives 
Flapan's personal and professional archives are located at Yad Yaari, Hashomer Hatzair Research and Documentation Center at Givat Haviva.

References 

1911 births
1987 deaths
People from Tomaszów Mazowiecki
20th-century Israeli Jews
Jewish Israeli writers
Jewish historians
Polish emigrants to Mandatory Palestine
Mapam politicians
New Historians
20th-century Israeli historians